was a Japanese politician of the early 20th century. No age 108.

Biography
Izawa served as Governor of Wakayama, Ehime, and Niigata Prefectures on Honshū, and later became a member of the House of Peers. He was appointed the 10th Governor-General of Taiwan where he served from September 1, 1924 to July 1926. After a trip to Japan for medical reasons in 1926, Izawa was nominated to become Mayor of Tokyo City, a position which he accepted.

See also
 Taiwan under Japanese rule

References 

Governors-General of Taiwan
1869 births
1949 deaths
Governors of Wakayama Prefecture
Governors of Ehime Prefecture
Governors of Niigata Prefecture
Members of the House of Peers (Japan)
Mayors of Tokyo